In the Battle of Castiglione on 5 August 1796, the French Army of Italy under the command of General Napoleon Bonaparte defeated an Austrian army led by Field Marshal Dagobert Sigmund von Wurmser. Castiglione and the Battle of Lonato were the major actions in a campaign which marked the first attempted relief of the Siege of Mantua. While Wurmser advanced east of Lake Garda with three columns, Peter Quasdanovich moved his column into the area west of Lake Garda. The Austrians pushed back the French forces and forced Bonaparte to raise the siege. However, the French commander massed against Quasdanovich and forced him to retreat after a week of see-saw fighting. After disposing of Quasdanovich, Bonaparte turned on Wurmser and defeated the main army also. In the sequel, the French pushed the Mantua garrison back and blockaded the city.

French Army

 Army of Italy: Napoleon Bonaparte (42,049)
 Division: General of Division André Masséna (15,391)
 Brigade: General of Brigade Barthélemy Catherine Joubert
 Brigade: General of Brigade Antoine La Valette
 Brigade: General of Brigade Antoine-Guillaume Rampon
 Brigade: General of Brigade Claude Perrin Victor
 Brigade: General of Brigade Jean Joseph Magdeleine Pijon
 Brigade: General of Brigade Paul Guillaume
 Division: General of Division Pierre Augereau (5,368)
 Brigade: General of Brigade Martial Beyrand
 Brigade: General of Brigade Jean Gilles André Robert
 Brigade: General of Brigade Gaspard Amédée Gardanne
 Division: General of Division Pierre Francois Sauret (4,462)
 Brigade: General of Brigade Jean Joseph Guieu
 Brigade: General of Brigade Jean-Baptiste Dominique Rusca
 Division: General of Division Jean-Mathieu-Philibert Sérurier vice Pascal Antoine Fiorella (10,521)
 Brigade: General of Brigade Louis Pelletier
 Brigade: General of Brigade Charles François Charton
 Brigade: General of Brigade Emmanuel Gervais de Roergaz de Serviez
 Brigade: General of Brigade Claude Dallemagne
 Division: General of Division Hyacinthe Francois Joseph Despinoy (4,772)
 Brigade: General of Brigade Nicolas Bertin
 Brigade: General of Brigade Jean-Baptiste Cervoni
 Cavalry: General of Division Charles Edward Jennings de Kilmaine (1,535)
 Brigade: General of Brigade Marc Antoine de Beaumont

Austrian Army

 Austrian Army: Feldmarschall Dagobert von Wurmser (60,690, 98 position and 94 battalion guns)
 Right (I) Column: Feldmarschall-Leutnant Peter Vitus von Quosdanovich (17,621)
 Brigade: General-major Prince Heinrich XV of Reuss-Plauen
 Brigade: General-major Johann Rudolph Sporck
 Brigade: General-major Peter Karl Ott von Bátorkéz
 Brigade: General-major Joseph Ocskay von Ocsko
 17 battalions (15,272), 13 squadrons (2,349), 24 position guns
 Right-Center (II) Column: Feldmarschall-Leutnant Michael von Melas (14,403)
 Brigade: General-major Peter Gummer
 Brigade: General-major Adam Bajalics von Bajahaza
 Division: Feldmarschallleutnant Karl Philipp Sebottendorf
 Brigade: General-major Franz Nicoletti
 Brigade: General-major Philipp Pittoni von Dannenfeld
 19 battalions (13,676), 4 squadrons (727), 24 position guns
 Left-Center (III) Column: Feldmarschall-Leutnant Paul Davidovich (9,892)
 Brigade: General-major Anton Ferdinand Mittrowsky
 Brigade: General-major Anton Lipthay de Kisfalud
 Brigade: General-major Leberecht Spiegel
 11 battalions (8,274), 10 squadrons (1,618), 40 position guns
 Left (IV) Column: Feldmarschall-Leutnant Johann Mészáros von Szoboszló (5,021)
 Brigade: General-major Prince Friedrich Franz Xaver of Hohenzollern-Hechingen
 Brigade: General-major Ferdinand Minckwitz
 5 battalions (3,949), 7 squadrons (1,072), 10 position guns
 Mantua Garrison: Feldmarschall-Leutnant Joseph Canto d'Irles (13,753)
 Brigade: General-major Gerhard Rosselmini (3,666 in 5 battalions)
 Brigade: General-major Josef Philipp Vukassovich (2,449 in 3 battalions)
 Brigade: Oberst Karl Salisch (1,489 in 6 battalions)
 Brigade: General-major Mathias Rukavina von Boynograd (2,443 in 5 battalions)
 Brigade: Oberst Strurioni (2,298 in 2½ bns)
 Unattached: 434 cavalry in 3½ squadrons, 96 sappers, 701 artillerists

See also
List of French generals of the Revolutionary and Napoleonic Wars

Notes

References
Boycott-Brown, Martin. The Road to Rivoli. London: Cassell & Co., 2001. 

Smith, Digby. The Napoleonic Wars Data Book. London: Greenhill, 1998.

External links 
The following are sources for the full names of Austrian and French generals.
Broughton, Tony. napoleon-series.org Generals Who Served in the French Army during the Period 1792-1815
Smith, Digby & Kudrna, Leopold (compiler). napoleon-series.org Austrian Generals of 1792-1815

French Revolutionary Wars orders of battle